The 1980 Pontins Camber Sands Championship was a professional invitational snooker tournament which took place in May 1980 in Rye, England.

Laid out similarly to the Pontins Professional championships, the tournament featured eight professional players. The quarter-final matches were contested over the best of 7 frames, the semi-final matches over the best of 9 frames, and the final over the best of 17 frames.

Alex Higgins won the event, beating Dennis Taylor 9–7 in the final after Taylor had taken a 5–0 lead. Higgins received £2,000 as winner, with Taylor taking £1,500 as runner-up.

Main draw

References

Snooker competitions in England
1980 in snooker
1980 in English sport